Sonja Ackermann-Olsen (13 March 1934 – 30 October 2018) was a Norwegian speed skater.

Her achievements include two overall victories at the Norwegian Allround Championships, in 1958 and 1959. She participated in the World Allround Speed Skating Championships for Women four times, placing 11th in 1953, and 9th in 1954, 1955 and 1958.

She died in October 2018.

References

External links

1934 births
2018 deaths
Norwegian female speed skaters
20th-century Norwegian women